Heslip is a surname. Notable people with the surname include:

 Brady Heslip (born 1990), Canadian basketball player
 Herbert Heslip (1913–1992), Northern Irish politician